Charles L. Smith (1853 – ?) was a political figure in New Brunswick, Canada. He represented Carleton County in the Legislative Assembly of New Brunswick from 1895 to 1899 as a Liberal member.

He was born in Woodstock, New Brunswick, of United Empire Loyalist descent. Smith married Luella McClary. He was president of the Patrons of Industry association for the county. Smith also served as a member of the county council, also serving as county warden.

References 
The Canadian parliamentary companion, 1897, JA Gemmill

1853 births
Year of death missing
New Brunswick Liberal Association MLAs